Club Deportivo Plus Ultra is a football team based in Llano de Brujas, Murcia. Founded in 1986, the team plays in Tercera División Group 13.

The club's home ground is Estadio Municipal.

Season to season

12 seasons in Tercera División

References

External links
Official website 
Futbolme team profile 

Football clubs in the Region of Murcia
Association football clubs established in 1986
1986 establishments in Spain